Advanced Mobile Phone System (AMPS) was an analog mobile phone system standard originally developed by Bell Labs and later modified in a cooperative effort between Bell Labs and Motorola. It was officially introduced in the Americas on October 13, 1983, and was deployed in many other countries too, including Israel in 1986, Australia in 1987, Singapore in 1988, and Pakistan in 1990. It was the primary analog mobile phone system in North America (and other locales) through the 1980s and into the 2000s. As of February 18, 2008, carriers in the United States were no longer required to support AMPS and companies such as AT&T and Verizon Communications have discontinued this service permanently. AMPS was discontinued in Australia in September 2000, in Pakistan by October 2004, in Israel by January 2010, and Brazil by 2010.

History 

The first cellular network efforts began at Bell Labs and with research conducted at Motorola. 
In 1960, John F. Mitchell
became Motorola's chief engineer for its mobile-communication products, and oversaw the development and marketing of the first pager to use transistors.

Motorola had long produced mobile telephones for automobiles, but these large and heavy models consumed too much power to allow their use without the automobile's engine running. Mitchell's team, which included the gifted Dr. Martin Cooper, developed portable cellular telephony. Cooper and Mitchell were among the Motorola employees granted a patent for this work in 1973.  The first call on the prototype connected, reportedly, to a wrong number.

While Motorola was developing a cellular phone, from 1968 to 1983 Bell Labs worked out a system called Advanced Mobile Phone System (AMPS), which became the first cellular network standard in the United States.  The first system was successfully deployed in Chicago, Illinois, in 1979.  Motorola and others designed and built the cellular phones for this and other cellular systems.

Martin Cooper, a former general manager for the systems division at Motorola, led a team that produced the first cellular handset in 1973 and made the first phone call from it. In 1983 Motorola introduced the DynaTAC 8000x, the first commercially available cellular phone small enough to be easily carried. He later introduced the so-called Bag Phone.

In 1992, the first smartphone, called IBM Simon, used AMPS.  Frank Canova led its design at IBM and it was demonstrated that year at the COMDEX computer-industry trade-show.  A refined version of the product was marketed to consumers in 1994 by BellSouth under the name Simon Personal Communicator.  The Simon was the first device that can be properly referred to as a "smartphone", even though that term was not yet coined.

Technology 
AMPS is a first-generation cellular technology that uses separate frequencies, or "channels", for each conversation. It therefore required considerable bandwidth for a large number of users. In general terms, AMPS was very similar to the older "0G" Improved Mobile Telephone Service it replaced, but used considerably more computing power to select frequencies, hand off conversations to land lines, and handle billing and call setup.

What really separated AMPS from older systems is the "back end" call setup functionality. In AMPS, the cell centers could flexibly assign channels to handsets based on signal strength, allowing the same frequency to be re-used, without interference, if locations were separated enough. The channels were grouped so a specific set was different of the one used on the cell nearby. This allowed a larger number of phones to be supported over a geographical area. AMPS pioneers coined the term "cellular" because of its use of small hexagonal "cells" within a system.

AMPS suffered from many weaknesses compared to today's digital technologies. As an analog standard, it was susceptible to static and noise, and there was no protection from 'eavesdropping' using a scanner or an older TV set that could tune into channels 70-83.

Cloning

In the 1990s, an epidemic of "cloning" cost the cellular carriers millions of dollars. An eavesdropper with specialized equipment could intercept a handset's ESN (Electronic Serial Number) and MDN or CTN (Mobile Directory Number or Cellular Telephone Number). The Electronic Serial Number, a 12-digit number sent by the handset to the cellular system for billing purposes, uniquely identified that phone on the network. The system then allowed or disallowed calls and/or features based on its customer file. A person intercepting an ESN/MDN pair could clone the combination onto a different phone and use it in other areas for making calls without paying.

Cellular phone cloning became possible with off-the-shelf technology in the 1990s. Would-be cloners required three key items :

 A radio receiver, such as the Icom PCR-1000, that could tune into the Reverse Channel (the frequency on which AMPS phones transmit data to the tower)
 A PC with a sound card and a software program called Banpaia
 A phone that could easily be used for cloning, such as the Oki 900

The radio, when tuned to the proper frequency, would receive the signal transmitted by the cell phone to be cloned, containing the phone's ESN/MDN pair. This signal would feed into the sound-card audio-input of the PC, and Banpaia would decode the ESN/MDN pair from this signal and display it on the screen. The hacker could then copy that data into the Oki 900 phone and reboot it, after which the phone network could not distinguish the Oki from the original phone whose signal had been received. This gave the cloner, through the Oki phone, the ability to use the mobile-phone service of the legitimate subscriber whose phone was cloned – just as if that phone had been physically stolen, except that the subscriber retained his or her phone, unaware that the phone had been cloned—at least until that subscriber received his or her next bill.

The problem became so large that some carriers required the use of a PIN before making calls. Eventually, the cellular companies initiated a system called RF Fingerprinting, whereby it could determine subtle differences in the signal of one phone from another and shut down some cloned phones. Some legitimate customers had problems with this though if they made certain changes to their own phone, such as replacing the battery and/or antenna.

The Oki 900 could listen in to AMPS phone-calls right out-of-the-box with no hardware modifications.

Standards
AMPS was originally standardized by American National Standards Institute (ANSI) as EIA/TIA/IS-3. EIA/TIA/IS-3 was superseded by EIA/TIA-553 and TIA interim standard with digital technologies, the cost of wireless service is so low that the problem of cloning  has virtually disappeared.

Frequency bands
AMPS cellular service operated in the 850 MHz Cellular band. For each market area, the United States Federal Communications Commission (FCC) allowed two licensees (networks) known as "A" and "B" carriers. Each carrier within a market used a specified "block" of frequencies consisting of 21 control channels and 395 voice channels. Originally, the B (wireline) side license was usually owned by the local phone company, and the A (non-wireline) license was given to wireless telephone providers.

At the inception of cellular in 1983, the FCC had granted each carrier within a market 333 channel pairs (666 channels total). By the late 1980s, the cellular industry's subscriber base had grown into the millions across America and it became necessary to add channels for additional capacity. In 1989, the FCC granted carriers an expansion from the previous 666 channels to the final 832 (416 pairs per carrier). The additional frequencies were from the band held in reserve for future (inevitable) expansion. These frequencies were immediately adjacent to the existing cellular band. These bands had previously been allocated to UHF TV channels 70–83.

Each duplex channel was composed of 2 frequencies. 416 of these were in the 824–849 MHz range for transmissions from mobile stations to the base stations, paired with 416 frequencies in the 869–894 MHz range for transmissions from base stations to the mobile stations. Each cell site used a different subset of these channels than its neighbors to avoid interference. This significantly reduced the number of channels available at each site in real-world systems. Each AMPS channel had a one way bandwidth of 30 kHz, for a total of 60 kHz for each duplex channel.

Laws were passed in the US which prohibited the FCC type acceptance and sale of any receiver which could tune the frequency ranges occupied by analog AMPS cellular services. Though the service is no longer offered, these laws remain in force (although they may no longer be enforced).

Narrowband AMPS
In 1991, Motorola proposed an AMPS enhancement known as narrowband AMPS (NAMPS or N-AMPS).

Digital AMPS

Later, many AMPS networks were partially converted to D-AMPS, often referred to as TDMA (though TDMA is a generic term that applies to many 2G cellular systems).  D-AMPS, commercially deployed since 1993, was a digital, 2G standard used mainly by AT&T Mobility and U.S. Cellular in the United States, Rogers Wireless in Canada, Telcel in Mexico, Telecom Italia Mobile (TIM) in Brazil, VimpelCom in Russia, Movilnet in Venezuela, and Cellcom in Israel.  In most areas, D-AMPS is no longer offered and has been replaced by more advanced digital wireless networks.

Successor technologies
AMPS and D-AMPS have now been phased out in favor of either CDMA2000 or GSM, which allow for higher capacity data transfers for services such as WAP, Multimedia Messaging System (MMS), and wireless Internet access. There are some phones capable of supporting AMPS, D-AMPS and GSM all in one phone (using the GAIT standard).

Analog AMPS being replaced by digital
In 2002, the FCC decided to no longer require A and B carriers to support AMPS service as of February 18, 2008. All AMPS carriers have converted to a digital standard such as CDMA2000 or GSM. Digital technologies such as GSM and CDMA2000 support multiple voice calls on the same channel and offer enhanced features such as two-way text messaging and data services.

Unlike in the United States, the Canadian Radio-television and Telecommunications Commission (CRTC) and Industry Canada have not set any requirement for maintaining AMPS service in Canada. Rogers Wireless has dismantled their AMPS (along with IS-136) network; the networks were shut down May 31, 2007. Bell Mobility and Telus Mobility, who operated AMPS networks in Canada, announced that they would observe the same timetable as outlined by the FCC in the United States, and as a result would not begin to dismantle their AMPS networks until after February 2008.

OnStar relied heavily on North American AMPS service for its subscribers because, when the system was developed, AMPS offered the most comprehensive wireless coverage in the US. In 2006, ADT asked the FCC to extend the AMPS deadline due to many of their alarm systems still using analog technology to communicate with the control centers. Cellular companies who own an A or B license (such as Verizon and Alltel) were required to provide analog service until February 18, 2008. After that point, however, most cellular companies were eager to shut down AMPS and use the remaining channels for digital services. OnStar transitioned to digital service with the help of data transport technology developed by Airbiquity, but warned customers who could not be upgraded to digital service that their service would permanently expire on January 1, 2008.

Commercial deployments of AMPS by country

See also
History of mobile phones

Citations

References
Interview of Joel Engel

History of mobile phones
Mobile radio telephone systems
Telecommunications-related introductions in 1983